Daisy Hill a town in Victoria, Australia located in the Shire of Central Goldfields. At the 2016 census, Daisy Hill had a population of 385.

The town began as a mining settlement, after a discovery of gold during the Gold Rush of 1853, the location became known as an extremely rich goldfield soon thereafter. Prior to this discovery, Daisy Hill had gained a particular notoriety, due to a gold rush in February 1849, that was based upon the claims made by one Thomas Chapman, a shepherd and former Parkhurst prison exile. Chapman sold a gold nugget to a Melbourne Jeweller, Mr. Brentani of Collins Street. Soon afterwards Chapman left the Port Phillip District for Sydney, although he returned again many years later.

Daisy Hill has a Community Centre Hall and public tennis courts. The last commercial shop in Daisy Hill closed around 2008.

See also
Amherst, Victoria

References